Edward Daniel Stone (August 21, 1909 – March 20, 1983), nicknamed "Ace", was an American Negro league outfielder in the 1930s and 1940s.

A native of Black Cat, Delaware, Stone attended Howard High School, where he was a standout athlete. Stone began his Negro leagues career in 1933 with the Bacharach Giants, and was known for his solid fielding and heavy bat. After his final Negro league season in 1946 with the Philadelphia Stars, he went on to play professionally in Mexico through the early 1950s.

Stone died in Bronx, New York in 1983 at age 73.

References

External links
 and Baseball-Reference Black Baseball stats and Seamheads

1909 births
1983 deaths
Bacharach Giants players
Brooklyn Eagles players
New York Black Yankees players
Newark Eagles players
Philadelphia Stars players
20th-century African-American sportspeople
Baseball outfielders